is a Japanese actor who has played roles in films and television dramas. He signed with Daiei film and made his film debut with Gan in 1966.

He is famous for playing the role of Kotaro Higashi in Ultraman Taro.  He is the only original Ultraman actor to have not reprised his role in any other Ultraman film or television series.

Filmography

Drama Series
1973: Ultraman Taro as Higashi Kotaro
1979: Kusa Moeru, Minamoto no Sanetomo
1984: Sanga Moyu, Keisuke Mishima
1988: Takeda Shingen, Yamagata Masakage
1989: Onihei Hankachō as Sakai
1994: Hana no Ran, Gan'ami
1996: Hideyoshi, Niwa Nagahide
2000: The One Stringed Harp
2002: Golden Bowl
2009: A Secret in Summer
2014: Mozu Season 2 - Maboroshi no Tsubasa

Movies
1966: Gan
1966: Red Angel
1967: Zen'in shugo shirizu 1
1968: The Time of Reckoning
1968: Gamera vs. Viras
1970: Innocent Sinner
1970: High-School Boss
1972: Uta
1974: Lived in a Dream
1975: I Am a Cat
1976: Between Wife and Woman
1982: The Tower of Lilies
1982: The Imperial
1983: Hometown
1983: Okinawan Boys
1989: Sadako Story
1991: Earth
1992: Godzilla vs. Mothra
1995: Godzilla vs. Destroyer
2000: The Frame
2000: Not Forgotten
2002: Mori no Gakko
2004: Izo
2007: The Kiss
2008: Yamazakura
2011: Hayabusa: Back to the Earth
2020: Hayabusa 2: Reborn, narrator

TV Movies
1989: Nemuri Kyōshirō
2012: Missing Person
2016: Simple is Best

References

Screening of 'Takamine' at Norton Simon Museum;The Rafu Shimpo-13 Jul 2012;

McDonald,K.I.;From Book to Screen: Modern Japanese Literature in Films: Modern ...;2016;
Ryfie,S.;Japan's Favorite Mon-star: The Unauthorized Biography of "The Big G";1998;
DVD "NECHYOSHA Photonikle" released on September 18, 2015 Selling agency - Digital Ultra Project DUPJ-133
" Ultraman Taro " related materials
"Taro tarou Ultraman T (Tarou): Validation · Second Ultra Boom" Tatsumi Publishing <Tatsumi Mook>, 1999 .  .
"Talk! Ultraman Brothers Gekito Hen" Best Sellers <Best Mook Series 23>, October 2013 .  .

1948 births
Living people
Male actors from Tokyo
Japanese male film actors
Japanese male television actors